Baek Seung-hee is a South Korean actress. She is known for her roles in dramas such as A Bird That Doesn't Sing, Secret Garden, Oh My Baby, Remarriage & Desires and Blind.

Filmography

Television series

Film

Music video appearances

Awards and nominations

References

External links 
 
 

1986 births
21st-century South Korean actresses
Living people
South Korean television actresses
South Korean film actresses